Jessica Ann Rothenberg (born May 28, 1987), better known as Jessica Rothe, is an American actress. She is known for her role in the MTV comedy series Mary + Jane (2016) and her lead role as Tree Gelbman in the comedy slasher film Happy Death Day (2017) and its 2019 sequel. She has also appeared in La La Land (2016), Forever My Girl (2018), and Valley Girl (2020). In 2020, Rothe appeared in the Amazon Prime Video science fiction drama series Utopia.

Early life
Rothe was born in Denver, Colorado, the daughter of Susan and Steve Rothenberg. Rothe's father is Jewish. Her paternal grandmother Colleen Rothenberg was a theatre actress who belonged to the Congregation Shomrei Torah synagogue in Santa Rosa, California.

Rothe took ballet classes when she was age 8. As a youth, she attended summer theater camps in Kansas City. Rothe attended Cherry Creek High School and then Boston University, graduating in 2009 with a bachelor's degree in Fine Arts, and during that time she learned to play the violin, tap dance, and make pottery.

Personal life
On September 12, 2020, Rothe married actor Eric Clem in Morrison, Colorado.

Filmography

Film

Television

Web series

References

External links

1987 births
21st-century American actresses
21st-century American Jews
American film actresses
American people of German descent
American television actresses
Actresses from Denver
Boston University College of Fine Arts alumni
Jewish American actresses
Living people